The De Geer family  (also: De Geer van Jutphaas and De Geer van Oudegein) is a prominent industrial family of Walloon origin that belongs to the Swedish and Dutch nobility.

History
The name derives from the town of Geer near Liège (in present-day Belgium). The oldest known ancestor, Lambier de Geer, lord of Gaillarmont, died in 1399 in Liège, then part of the Prince-Bishopric of Liège. His descendant Louys de Geer (1535–1602) moved from Liège to Aachen and later to Dordrecht in the Dutch Republic for religious reasons. Subsequent generations became notable in Sweden and the Netherlands from the early 17th century, mainly centered on the iron-foundry company town Finspång, but often extending to science, art and national politics. The larger, Swedish branch of the family retained its contacts with the Netherlands. Some of them hold the title of baron. Both branches are still in existence.

Notable members
 Louis De Geer  (1587–1652), Dutch financier and industrialist, founder of the Swedish branch.
 , industrial entrepreneur.
 Charles De Geer (1720–1778), Swedish entomologist.
 , Swedish politician
  (1748–1803), Swedish Council member
  (1750–1820), Finnish lantmarskalk of the Noble estate at the Diet of Porvoo.
 Charlotta Aurora De Geer (1779–1834), Swedish salonist. 
  (1781–1861), Swedish lantmarskalk of the Riksdag of the Estates 
  (1784–1857), Dutch politician. 
 Ulla De Geer (1793-1869), Swedish salonist.
  (1816–1903), Dutch jurist and historian
 Louis Gerhard De Geer (1818–1896), Swedish statesman and writer, Prime Minister of Sweden 1876–80
 Karl Vilhelm Konstantin De Geer (1839–1904), Finnish general in the Imperial Russian army 
 Gerhard Louis De Geer (1854–1935), baron, Prime Minister of Sweden 1920–21
 Gerard De Geer af Finspång (1858–1943), Swedish geologist.
 Sten De Geer (1886–1933), Swedish geographer and ethnographer
 Dirk Jan de Geer (1870–1960), prime minister of the Netherlands.
  (1927–1984), Swedish artist and portrait painter. Great-grandson of Louis Gerard De Geer.
 Carl Johan De Geer (born 1938), Swedish artist.
  (1946–2020), Dutch actor, director and television producer. 
 Boudewijn de Geer (born 1955), Dutch football player, grandson of Dirk Jan de Geer.
  (born 1971), Swedish nationalist and traditionalist Catholic writer.
 Mike de Geer (born 1989), Dutch football player, son of Boudewijn de Geer.

References

Literature
Nederland's Adelsboek 83 (1993), pp. 42–86.

Geer
Geer
Geer
Geer